Anaeromonadea is a class of excavates, comprising the oxymonads and Trimastix.

Another name used is "Preaxostyla".

Phylogeny and Taxonomy
Based on the work of Zhang et al. 2015.

References

External links
 Tree of Life: Preaxostyla

Metamonads
Excavata classes